Sarah Vaughan is the debut 1950 LP album of Sarah Vaughan with George Treadwell and His All Stars, 10" Columbia Records CL 6133. The instrumentalists comprised Billy Taylor Sr. bass, clarinet Tony Scott, drums J.C. Heard, guitars Freddie Green and Mundell Lowe, piano Jimmy Jones, on tenor saxophone Budd Johnson, trombone Bennie Green, and trumpet Miles Davis. The 8 songs were later incorporated into 1955's Sarah Vaughan in Hi-Fi.

Track listing
East Of The Sun (And West Of The Moon) - Brooks Bowman
Nice Work If You Can Get It – George Gershwin & Ira Gershwin
Come Rain Or Come Shine – Harold Arlen & Johnny Mercer
Mean To Me  – Fred E. Ahlert, Roy Turk
It Might As Well Be Spring – Rodgers & Hammerstein
Can't Get Out of This Mood – Frank Loesser, Jimmy McHugh
Goodnight My Love – Harry Revel, Mack Gordon
Ain't Misbehavin' – Andy Razaf, Baba Brooks, Walter Donaldson

References

Sarah Vaughan albums
1950 debut albums
Columbia Records albums